Strikeforce: Diaz vs. Cyborg was a mixed martial arts event that was held by Strikeforce on January 29, 2011 at the HP Pavilion in San Jose, California, United States.

Background
A welterweight bout between Nate Coy and Nate Moore, which was originally scheduled to take place at ShoMMA 13, took place at this event.

Six of the preliminary card fights were streamed live on Sherdog.com.

This was the last Strikeforce event to feature amateur bouts, which were removed from all future Strikeforce cards following the promotion's sale to Zuffa, LLC in March 2011.

Strikeforce Challengers color commentator Pat Miletich filled in for the absent Gus Johnson on the live broadcast of this card.

The event drew an estimated 561,000 viewers, with a peak at 850,000 on Showtime.

Results

Fighter salaries

Champ Nick Diaz: $150,000 (no win bonus)
def. Evangelista "Cyborg" Santos: $20,000

Champ Ronaldo "Jacare" Souza: $85,000 ($15,000 win bonus)
def. Robbie Lawler : $65,000

Herschel Walker: $5,000 (no win bonus)
def. Scott Carson: $5,000

Roger Gracie: $75,000 (no win bonus)
def. Trevor Prangley: $30,000

Nate Moore: $4,000 ($2,000 win bonus)
def. Nathan Coy: $3,000

Isaiah Hill: $3,000 ($1,500 win bonus)
def. Bobby Stack: $1,500

Ron Keslar: $3,000 ($1,500 win bonus)
def. Eric Lawson: $1,500

Germaine de Randamie: $3,000 ($1,000 win bonus)
def. Stephanie Webber: $1,000

James Terry: $3,000 ($1,500 win bonus)
def. Lucas Gamaza: $1,500

Jenna Castillo: $3,000 ($1,500 win bonus)
def. Charlene Gellner: $1,000

References

Diaz vs. Cyborg
2011 in mixed martial arts
Mixed martial arts in San Jose, California
2011 in sports in California
Events in San Jose, California